Qingshan District (Mongolian:   Čiŋšan toɣoriɣ) is a district of the city of Baotou, Inner Mongolia, China.

References

www.xzqh.org 

County-level divisions of Inner Mongolia